Streblospio is a genus of polychaetes belonging to the family Spionidae.

The species of this genus are found in Europe, America.

Species:

Streblospio benedicti 
Streblospio eridani 
Streblospio eunateae 
Streblospio eunatei 
Streblospio gynobranchiata 
Streblospio japonica 
Streblospio padventralis 
Streblospio shrubsolii

References

Canalipalpata
Polychaete genera